This is a list of known rulers of Sindh, in present-day Sindh, Pakistan. This list starts from the establishment of the Rai dynasty around 489 AD until the conquest of the Sindh from Talpur dynasty by East India Company in 1843 AD.

Sultan ( Sulṭān) is a title used by Muslim Sindhi dynasties in Sindh, modern day Pakistan.

Rai dynasty (480 – 632 AD)
Known rulers of the Rai dynasty are:

Brahmin dynasty (632 – 712 AD)
The known rulers of the Brahmin dynasty are:
 Chach
 Chandar
 Dāhir ( from Alor)

Under the Umayyad Caliphate:
 Dahirsiya ( from Brahmanabad)
 Hullishāh
 Shishah

Vilayet As-Sindh (caliphate)
In 712, Sind was conquered by the Umayyad Caliphate. The emirs appointed by the caliphate are as below;

Habbari dynasty (855 – 1010 AD)
The Habbari rulers stylised themselves as Emirs.
Note: the dates below are only approximate.

 Umar ibn'Abd al-Aziz al'Habbari (855–884)
 Abdullah ibn Umar (884–913)
 Umar ibn-Abdullah (913–943)
 Muhammad ibn Abdullah (943–973)
 Ali ibn Umar (973–987)
 Isa ibn Ali
 Manbi ibn Ali ibn Umar (987–1010)

Soomra dynasty (1011 – 1336 AD)

The list of Soomra rulers is as follows;
 
1011 – 1026: Khafif I bin Rao Soomar Parmar Soomra 
 
1026 – 1053: Soomar bin Rao Soomar Parmar
 
1053 – 1068: Bhungar I bin Khafif I Soomro
 
1068 – 1092: Dodo I bin Bhungar Soomro
 
1092 – 1098: Zenav Tari Sultana bint Dodo I Soomro (d/o Sardar Dodo I)
 
1098 – 1107: Sanghar bin Dodo I Soomro
 
1107 – 1107 : Hamun Sultana (w/o Sardar Sanghar)
 
1107 – 1142: Khafif II bin Soomar bin Dodo I Soomro
 
1142 – 1181: Umar I bin Soomar bin Dodo I Soomro
 
1181 – 1195: Dodo II Bin Khafif II Soomro
 
1195 – 1222: Bhungar II bin Chanesar bin Hamir bin Dodo I Soomro
 
1222 – 1228: Chanesar I bin Bhungar II Soomro (first reign)
 
1228 – 1236: Ganhwar I bin Bhungar II Soomro (first reign)
 
1236 – 1237: Chanesar I bin Bhungar II Soomro (second reign)
 
1237 – 1241: Ganhwar I bin Bhungar II Soomro (second reign)
 
1241 – 1256: Muhammad Tur bin Ganhwar I Soomro
 
1256 – 1259: Ganhwar II bin Muhammad Tur Soomro
 
1259 – 1273: Dodo III bin Ganhwar II Soomro
 
1273 – 1283: Tai bin Dodo III Soomro
 
1283 – 1300: Chanesar II bin Dodo III Soomro
 
1300 – 1315: Bhungar III bin Chanesar II Soomro
 
1315 – 1333: Khafif III bin Chanesar II Soomro

Samma dynasty (1336–1527) 
The Samma dynasty which was a Muslim dynasty of Sindh who succeeded Soomras took the title Jam, the equivalent of Sultan. The main sources of information on the Samma dynasty are Nizammud-din, Abu-'l-Fazl, Firishta and Mir Ma'sum, all lacking in detail, and with conflicting information. A plausible reconstruction of the chronology is given in the History of Delhi Sultanate by M.H. Syed:

Arghun dynasty (1520 – 1554 AD)

Tarkhan dynasty (1554 – 1591 AD)

Thatta Subah (Mughal Empire)
Mirza Ghazi Beg Trakhan 1591–1612 AD
Mirza Abdul Qasim Sultan Trakhan 1612–? AD
Aurangzeb 1649–1653 AD
Mian Nasir Muhammad Kalhoro 1657–1692 AD  
Mian Deen Muhammad Kalhoro 1692–1701 AD

Kalhora dynasty (1701 – 1783 AD)

 
 Mian Nasir Muhammad Kalhoro 1657–1692
 Mian Deen Muhammad Kalhoro 1692–1699
 Mian Yar Muhammad 1701–1719
 Mian Noor Muhammad 1719–1755
 Muhammad Muradyab Khan 1755–1757
 Mian Ghulam Shah Kalhoro 1757–1772
 Mian Sarfraz Kalhoro (Khudayar Khan) 1772–1775                                       
 Mian Haji Abdul Nabi Kalhoro 1775–1783

Talpur dynasty (1783 – 1843 AD) 
Mir Fateh Ali Khan Talpur 1783–1801
Mir ghulam Ali khan (1801–1811)
Mir karam ali (1811–1828)
Mir murad ali (1828–1833)
Mir noor Muhammad (1833–1841)
Mir Muhammad Naseer khan (1841–1843)

See also
 Battle of Fatehpur (1519)
 History of Sindh

References

External links
 Islamic culture – Page 429, by Islamic Culture Board
 A History of India Under the Two First Sovereigns of the House of Taimur, by William Erskine
 The Ṭabaqāt-i-Akbarī of K̲h̲wājah Nizāmuddīn Ahmad: a history of India, by Niẓām al-Dīn Aḥmad ibn Muḥammad Muqīm, Brajendranath De, Baini Prashad
 Bibliotheca Indica – Page 778, by Royal Asiatic Society of Bengal, Asiatic Society (Calcutta, India)
 Searchlights on Baloches and Balochistan, by Mir Khuda Bakhsh Marri
 The Delhi Sultanate, by Kanaiyalal Maneklal Munshi, Ramesh Chandra Majumdar, Asoke Kumar Majumdar,

Sindh
History of Sindh